Neocyttus is a genus of oreos.

Species
There are currently four recognized species in this genus:
 Neocyttus acanthorhynchus Regan, 1908
 Neocyttus helgae (Holt & Byrne, 1908) (False boarfish)
 Neocyttus psilorhynchus Yearsley & Last, 1998 (Rough oreodory)
 Neocyttus rhomboidalis Gilchrist, 1906 (Spiky oreo)

References

Oreosomatidae
Ray-finned fish genera